TRHS may refer to:
 Theodore Roosevelt High School (Gary), a high school in Gary, Indiana
 Theodore Roosevelt High School (Des Moines), a high school in Des Moines, Iowa
 Theodore Roosevelt High School (New York City), a former high school in the Bronx, New York
 Theodore Roosevelt High School (Kent, Ohio)
 ThunderRidge High School, a high school in Highlands Ranch, Colorado
 Timberlane Regional High School, a high school in Plaistow, New Hampshire
 Transactions of the Royal Historical Society, a United Kingdom scholarly journal 
 Two Rivers High School (Arkansas), a high school in Ola, Arkansas
 Two Rivers High School (Wisconsin) - Two Rivers, Wisconsin, USA

See also
Roosevelt High School (disambiguation)